A brunette is a person with brown hair.

Brunette may also refer to:

People
 Andrew Brunette (born 1973), Canadian ice hockey player
 Justin Brunette (born 1975), American baseball player
 Tommy Brunette, a member of punk rock band Towers of London
 Brunette, Armenian singer-songwriter

Places
 Brunette Downs, a cattle station in the Northern Territory, Australia
 Brunette, Newfoundland and Labrador, a settlement in Canada
 Brunette Island, an island in Canada
 Brunette River, a river in British Columbia in Canada

Other uses
 The Brunettes, a New Zealand indie pop group
 Brunette (song form), an 18th-century French popular song form

See also